This article lists political parties in Serbia, including former parties that existed in the Kingdom of Serbia between the early 1860s and 1918.

The Kingdom of Serbia operated under the multi-party system until 1918 when it became Kingdom of Serbs, Croats and Slovenes. After World War II, Serbia was reorganized into a one-party socialist republic. After the re-establishment of the multi-party system in 1990, new parties were established such as the Socialist Party of Serbia (SPS; direct successor of the League of Communists of Serbia), Democratic Party (DS), Serbian Renewal Movement (SPO), Serbian Radical Party (SRS), Civic Alliance of Serbia (GSS) and others. Serbia was de facto a dominant-party state between 1990 and 2000, during the rule of Slobodan Milošević and his Socialist Party of Serbia. In the year 2000, Milošević and his party were overthrown which led to the disestablishment of the dominant-party system in Serbia. Between 2000 and 2012, Serbia was ruled by the centre-left Democratic Party. After the Serbian Progressive Party (SNS) gained power in 2012, Serbia began to shift back to authoritarianism. Since 2014, Serbia has been de facto a dominant-party state, and in 2020 the ruling party and its government partners (including SPS and two minority parties) won a supermajority of seats in the parliament, while the opposition only had 7 seats out of 250. In 2022, the opposition parties returned to the parliament with the most seats since 2012.

During the entirety of the 1990s, Serbia's opposition which was composed of centrist, liberal and right-wing parties (DS, SPO, GSS, Democratic Party of Serbia (DSS) and others) clashed with the ruling nationalist parties, the left-wing SPS, and the far-right SRS. The Serbian Radical Party went into the opposition a couple of times during this period but even then they were described as a satellite party of the ruling SPS. After the fall of Milošević in 2000, the opposition gained a lot of popularity while the ruling SPS went into decline until 2008, while their former coalition partner, SRS, managed to stabilize its position in Serbian politics. In the 2000s, Serbia also experienced new liberal and social democratic parties (Liberal Democratic Party (LDP), Social Democratic Party (SDP), Social Democratic Union (SDU) and others) and also new right-wing parties and organizations managed to get on the scene.

Contemporary parties

Parties represented in the National Assembly 

Following political parties are being represented in the National Assembly after the 2022 Serbian general election.

Non-parliamentary parties 
The following political parties were previously represented in the National Assembly.

Minor parties 
The following list includes political parties that have not been represented in the National Assembly yet, although they either took part in parliamentary elections or received certain attention in the public.

Historical parties 
The following list includes political parties that existed in the Kingdom of Serbia (1881–1918), Socialist Republic of Serbia (1945–1990), and the Republic of Serbia (1990–present).

See also 
 List of political parties in Yugoslavia – contains a list of political parties in the period of Kingdom (1918–1941) and then Socialist Federal Republic of Yugoslavia (1945–1991)

References 

Serbia
 List of political parties in Serbia
Politics of Serbia
Political parties
Political parties
Serbia